Nanjing station is a railway station on the Taiwan Railways Administration West Coast line located in Shuishang Township, Chiayi County, Taiwan.

History
The station was opened on 20 March 1911.

See also
 List of railway stations in Taiwan

References

External links 

1911 establishments in Taiwan
Railway stations in Chiayi County
Railway stations opened in 1911
Railway stations served by Taiwan Railways Administration